The Minister of Commerce was a member of the Executive Committee of the Privy Council of Northern Ireland (Cabinet) in the Parliament of Northern Ireland which governed Northern Ireland from 1921 to 1972.  The post was combined with that of the Minister of Agriculture until 1925.  In 1943, it was renamed Minister of Commerce and Production and was combined with the post of Prime Minister of Northern Ireland until 1945, then with Leader of the Senate of Northern Ireland until 1949.

Parliamentary Secretary to the Ministry of Commerce (and Production)
1921 – 1925 Robert McKeown
1925 – 1941 vacant
1941 – 1943 Sir Wilson Hungerford
1943 – 1945 Brian Maginess
1945 vacant
1945 – 1949 Robert Perceval-Maxwell
1949 - 1952 vacant
1952 – 1953 2nd Baron Glentoran
1953 - 1959 vacant
1959 – 1961 William Morgan
1961 vacant
1961 – 1965 William Fitzsimmons
1965 - 1969 vacant
1969 – 1971 John Brooke
Office abolished 1971

References
The Government of Northern Ireland

1921 establishments in Northern Ireland
1972 disestablishments in Northern Ireland
Executive Committee of the Privy Council of Northern Ireland